Celebrity Big Brother 18 was the eighteenth series of the British reality television series Celebrity Big Brother, hosted by Emma Willis  and narrated by Marcus Bentley. The series launched on 28 July 2016, just two days after the conclusion of Big Brother 17  on Channel 5 in the United Kingdom and TV3 in Ireland. The series ended on 26 August 2016, making it the longest summer series to date and the third-longest series of Celebrity Big Brother in its history, behind series 15 and 17, respectively. Rylan Clark-Neal continues to present the spin-off show Celebrity Big Brother's Bit on the Side. It is the eleventh celebrity series and the seventeenth series of Big Brother overall to air on Channel 5.

On 26 August 2016, the series was won by Stephen Bear with Ricky Norwood finishing as runner-up.

Production

Eye logo
The official eye logo for the series was released on 8 July 2016 when it was posted online by presenter Emma Willis. The eye is the same that was used in Big Brother 17 which was split, with black on one side and white on the other with shattered, coloured glass separating them down the middle, however the logo features a star in the middle to represent the celebrity series.
On 15 July 2016 a revamped eye was revealed. The revamped eye is the same as the former eye, but now split into a gold half and a white half.

Teasers
On 19 July 2016, a brief 4-second "eye flash" aired on Channel 5 with the series eye logo emblazoned on a suitcase. On 21 July 2016, countdown adverts started airing with clues to the housemates identities, with the clues being "Beach bod", "Glamour puss", "National treasure", and "Iconic model".

Broadcasting
On 8 July 2016, it was confirmed that the spin-off show Bit on the Side would air an additional episode on Sunday nights on 5Star. Hour-long midnight live feed also returned for the series.

House
On 28 July 2016, Good Morning Britain toured the house and uploaded a 30-second video to their YouTube channel containing pictures of the kitchen area, stairs, bedroom and an empty living area. The sofa was confirmed to be Emerald Green.

The staircase was changed to gold along with the diary room door and walls. In the bedroom the gold theme continued and the carpet was changed to cream colour. The pod was also changed to a golden front with a red and orange theme inside. The bathroom was pretty much the same however all of the LED lighting was changed to a golden colour to complement the celebrity series.

Housemates
On Day 1, fifteen housemates entered the house:

Aubrey O'Day
Aubrey O'Day, is a singer and reality television personality from San Francisco, a member of the duo Dumblonde and a former member of the platinum-selling girl group Danity Kane. In 2012 she competed in the fifth series of The Celebrity Apprentice, where she finished third before being fired by Donald Trump. She competed on Celebrity Big Brother in 2016. On Day 6, she received a formal and final warning for unacceptable behaviour. On Day 30, she left the house in fifth place.

Stephen Bear
Stephen Bear, known as Bear, is a British reality television personality from Walthamstow, who was featured as a cast member on the third series of MTV's Ex on the Beach where he began a relationship with Geordie Shore star Vicky Pattison. He entered the house on Day 1. On Day 7 he was given a formal and final warning for unacceptable behaviour. On Day 9, he was cursed with eternal nomination for the duration of the series by his other housemates and faced every subsequent eviction. On Day 30, he left the house as the winner.

Christopher Biggins
Christopher Biggins, also known as Biggins, is an actor from Hackney who has starred in Porridge, I, Claudius and Whatever Happened to the Likely Lads?. In 2007 he won the seventh series of I'm a Celebrity... Get Me Out of Here!. He entered the house on Day 1. He was removed from the house on Day 9 after making offensive comments. Forty-four people complained to Ofcom about comments Biggins made about bisexuals, but Ofcom ruled that although the comments could cause offence, they were likely to be within the audience's expectations, and his comments were therefore found not to be in breach of broadcasting rules.

Chloe Khan
Chloe Khan, formerly Chloe Mafia, aged 25 is a model and media personality from Wakefield, West Yorkshire, known from her Manchester audition on the seventh series of The X Factor and for appearing on Snog Marry Avoid?. She then became a Playboy model. She entered the house on Day 1. She became the third housemate to be evicted on Day 16, following an eviction showdown with Marnie.

Frankie Grande
Frankie Grande is an American host of Amazon's Style Code Live, Broadway performer and "social media mogul". He is the half-brother of award-winning singer and actress Ariana Grande. In 2014, he competed in the sixteenth series of Big Brother USA where he finished fifth. He entered the house on Day 1. On Day 30, he left the house in sixth place.

Grant Bovey
Grant Bovey is a British businessman who is most notable for his relationships, including marriage to former Celebrity housemate Anthea Turner. He entered the house on Day 1. He became the first housemate to be evicted.

Heavy D
Colin Newell, better known as Heavy D, is best known for appearing on Storage Hunters UK, where his catchphrase is "BOOM!" He entered the house on Day 1. He became the fourth housemate to be evicted on Day 20.

James Whale
James Whale is an English radio and television host, known for his right-wing views. He believes men and women can never be equal. He entered the house on Day 1. He became the sixth to be evicted on Day 23.

Katie Waissel
Katie Waissel is a singer-songwriter who was a contestant on the seventh series of The X Factor, where she reached the live shows and ultimately finished seventh. She entered the house on Day 1. She became the seventh housemate to be evicted on Day 27.

Lewis Bloor
Lewis Bloor is an English reality television personality, best known for starring in the ITVBe semi-reality programme The Only Way Is Essex from the tenth to the seventeenth series. He entered the House on Day 1. On Day 20 he was given a formal and final warning for unacceptable behaviour. He became the fifth housemate to be evicted on Day 23.

Marnie Simpson
Marnie Simpson is an English reality television personality, best known as a cast member in the MTV reality series, Geordie Shore from series 7 onwards. She entered the house on Day 1. On Day 30, she left the house in fourth place.

Renee Graziano
Renee Graziano is an American reality television personality and author. She is known for being the daughter of Anthony Graziano, a former consigliere of the Bonanno crime family and her role as a cast member of the VH1 reality series Mob Wives. Renee entered the house on Day 1. On Day 30, she left the house in third place.

Ricky Norwood
Ricky Norwood is an English actor, most notable for playing Fatboy in the BBC soap opera EastEnders between 2010 and 2015. He entered the House on Day 1. On Day 30, he left the house as runner-up.

Saira Khan
Saira Khan is an English television personality. She is best known for being the runner-up on the first series of The Apprentice, and for appearing as a regular panellist on Loose Women. She entered the house on Day 1. She was the second housemate to be evicted on Day 13.

Samantha Fox
Samantha Fox is an English dance-pop singer, songwriter, actress, and former glamour model. In 2009 she competed in the ninth series of I'm a Celebrity... Get Me Out of Here!, where she finished ninth. She entered the house on Day 1. She became the eighth housemate to be evicted on Day 27.

Summary

Nominations table

Notes

Ratings

References

External links
 
 

2016 British television seasons
18